In mathematics, Pugh's closing lemma is a result that links  periodic orbit solutions of  differential equations to  chaotic behaviour. It can be formally stated as follows:

Let  be a  diffeomorphism of a  compact  smooth manifold .

Interpretation
Pugh's closing lemma means, for example, that any chaotic set in a bounded continuous dynamical system corresponds to a periodic orbit in a different but closely related dynamical system. As such, an open set of conditions on a bounded continuous dynamical system that rules out periodic behaviour also implies that the system cannot behave chaotically; this is the basis of some autonomous convergence theorems.

See also
Smale's problems

References

Further reading
 

Dynamical systems
Lemmas in analysis
Limit sets